Police ranks of Poland - ranks of police officers denoting the position of a given officer in the police hierarchy in Poland.

Polish State Police

Officers

Other

Railway Police

Officers

Other

Military Gendarmerie

Officers

Enlisted

Border guard

Officers

Enlisted

State Police (1918–1939)

Police rank and equivalent army rank:
  – 
  – 
  – 
  – 
  – 
  – 
  – 
  – 
  – 
  – 
  – no equivalent
  – 

Officers

Other

Blue Police (1939-1944)

The ranks of the Blue Police was as following:

See also 
 Polish Armed Forces rank insignia
 Ranks and insignia of NATO Armies
 Comparative military ranks
 European Gendarmerie Force ranks
 Polish Scouts rank insignia

Notes

References

 
Poland
Law enforcement-related lists